Trypoxylon collinum is a species of square-headed wasp in the family Crabronidae. It is found in North America. It nests inside hollow tubes.

Subspecies
These two subspecies belong to the species Trypoxylon collinum:
 Trypoxylon collinum collinum F. Smith, 1856 i g
 Trypoxylon collinum rubrocinctum Packard, 1867 i c g
Data sources: i = ITIS, c = Catalogue of Life, g = GBIF, b = Bugguide.net

References

External links

Crabronidae
Articles created by Qbugbot
Insects described in 1856